Anna Timofeyeva (born 30 November 1996) is a Russian ice hockey player,  playing with SKSO Yekaterinburg of the Zhenskaya Hockey League (ZhHL).

She represented  at the 2019 IIHF Women's World Championship and won a gold medal with the Russian team in the women's ice hockey tournament at the 2019 Winter Universiade.

References

External links
 

1996 births
Living people
Sportspeople from Tver
Russian women's ice hockey forwards
Competitors at the 2019 Winter Universiade
Universiade gold medalists for Russia
Universiade medalists in ice hockey
Biryusa Krasnoyarsk players
HC SKIF players